Aitor Garmendia (born 3 March 1968, in Itsasondo) is a former Spanish racing cyclist. He rode in 6 editions of the Tour de France, 8 editions of the Vuelta a España, and 1 edition of the Giro d'Italia.

Major results

1990
 1st GP Llodio
 5th Overall Vuelta a Aragón
 8th Overall Tour de la Communauté Européenne
1991
 8th Subida a Urkiola
1992
 9th Subida a Urkiola
1993
 4th Overall Vuelta a Andalucía
1994
 1st Stage 7 (ITT) Volta a Catalunya
 2nd Overall Vuelta a Murcia
 3rd Time trial, National Road Championships
 5th GP Villafranca de Ordizia
 6th Overall Tour de Luxembourg
1995
 1st Subida a Txitxarro
 2nd Overall Vuelta a Castilla y León
1st Stage 1
 2nd Overall Vuelta a Aragón
 3rd Time trial, National Road Championships
 3rd Overall Setmana Catalana de Ciclisme
 4th Overall Vuelta a Murcia
 10th Overall Ronde van Nederland
1996
 1st Prueba Villafranca de Ordizia
 2nd Overall Vuelta a Aragón
1st Stage 2
 6th Overall Critérium International
 9th Trofeo Luis Puig
1997
 1st Overall Volta ao Alentejo
1st Stage 5 (ITT)
 1st Overall Vuelta a Aragón
1st Stage 4b (ITT)
 1st Overall Tour of Galicia
1st Stage 3b (ITT)
 4th GP Llodio
 7th Trofeo Comunidad Foral de Navarra
 9th Chrono des Herbiers
 10th Overall Critérium International
1st Stage 3 (ITT)
1998
 1st Overall Vuelta a Aragón
1st Stage 2
 1st Overall Vuelta a Castilla y León
1st Stage 2
 2nd Overall Euskal Bizikleta
 5th Overall Tour of the Basque Country
 7th Overall Vuelta a La Rioja
1999
 3rd Trofeo Luis Ocana
2000
 1st Stage 4 Euskal Bizikleta
 2nd Overall Vuelta a Aragón
 3rd Overall Vuelta a Andalucía
 7th Overall Vuelta a Asturias
 7th Overall Vuelta a La Rioja
 8th Overall Tour of the Basque Country
 8th Overall Setmana Catalana de Ciclisme
2001
 2nd Overall Deutschland Tour
 2nd Overall Peace Race
 3rd Road race, National Road Championships
2002
 2nd Overall Deutschland Tour
1st Stage 3
 2nd Overall Volta a Catalunya
1st Stage 3 (ITT)
 3rd Overall Peace Race
 5th Overall Paris–Nice
2003
 7th Luk-Cup Bühl

Grand Tour general classification results timeline

References

1968 births
Living people
Spanish male cyclists
People from Goierri
Sportspeople from Gipuzkoa
Cyclists from the Basque Country (autonomous community)